A molecular-weight size marker, also referred to as a protein ladder, DNA ladder, or RNA ladder, is a set of standards that are used to identify the approximate size of a molecule run on a gel during electrophoresis, using the principle that molecular weight is inversely proportional to migration rate through a gel matrix. Therefore, when used in gel electrophoresis, markers effectively provide a logarithmic scale by which to estimate the size of the other fragments (providing the fragment sizes of the marker are known).

Protein, DNA, and RNA markers with pre-determined fragment sizes and concentrations are commercially available. These can be run in either agarose or polyacrylamide gels. The markers are loaded in lanes adjacent to sample lanes before the commencement of the run.

DNA markers

Development
Although the concept of molecular-weight markers has been retained, techniques of development have varied throughout the years. New inventions of molecular-weight markers are distributed in kits specific to the marker's type.

An early problem in the development of markers was achieving high resolution throughout the entire length of the marker. Depending on the running conditions of gel electrophoresis, fragments may have been compressed, disrupting clarity. To address this issue, a kit for Southern Blot analysis was developed in 1990, providing the first marker to combine target DNA and probe DNA. This technique took advantage of logarithmic spacing, and could be used to identify target bands ranging over a length of 20,000 nucleotides.

Design
There are two common methods in which to construct a DNA molecular-weight size marker. One such method employs the technique of partial ligation. DNA ligation is the process by which linear DNA pieces are connected to each other via covalent bonds; more specifically, these bonds are phosphodiester bonds. Here, a 100bp duplex DNA piece is partially ligated. The consequence of this is that dimers of 200bp, trimers of 300bp, tetramers of 400bp, pentamers of 500bp, etc. will form. Additionally, a portion of the 100bp dsDNA will remain. As a result, a DNA "ladder" composed of DNA pieces of known molecular mass is created on the gel.

The second method employs the use of restriction enzymes and a recognized DNA sequence. The DNA is digested by a particular restriction enzyme, resulting in DNA pieces of varying molecular masses. One of the advantages of this method is that more marker can readily be created simply by digesting more of the known DNA. On the other hand, the size of the DNA pieces are based on the sites where the restriction enzyme cuts. This makes it more difficult to control the size of the fragments in the marker.

More recently, another method for constructing DNA molecular-weight size markers is being employed by laboratories. This strategy involves the use of Polymerase Chain Reaction (PCR). This is achieved one or two ways: 1) a DNA target is amplified at the same time via primer sets, or 2) different DNA targets are amplified independently via particular primers.

Effects of gel conditions
As with experimental samples, the conditions of the gel can affect the molecular-weight size marker that runs alongside them. Factors such as buffer, charge/voltage, and concentration of gel can affect the mobility and/or appearance of your marker/ladder/standard. These elements need to be taken into consideration when selecting a marker and when analyzing the final results on a gel.

Protein markers

Development
Previously, protein markers had been developed using a variety of whole proteins. The development of a kit including a molecular-weight size marker based on protein fragments began in 1993. This protein marker, composed of 49 different amino acid sequences, included multidomain proteins, and allowed for the analysis of proteins cleaved at different sites.

Current technique improvements in protein markers involve the use of auto-development. The first auto-developed regularly-weight protein marker was invented in 2012.

Design
Similar to DNA markers, these markers are typically composed of purified proteins whose molecular masses are already known. The list below outlines some of the proteins, as well as the molecular mass, that are commonly used when constructing a protein marker.

Choosing the correct protein marker
Molecular-weight size markers can be broken up into two categories: molecular weight markers vs. molecular ladder markers. Markers are either stained or unstained, and depending on the circumstance, one may be more appropriate than another. Molecular-weight size markers can also be biochemically altered. The conjugation with biotin is the most common. Molecular-weight size markers are most commonly used in SDS-polyacrylamide gel electrophoresis and western blotting.
With all the different types and uses of molecular-weight size markers, it is important to choose the appropriate protein standard. Besides the most common use, as a way to calculate the molecular weight of the samples, other uses include allowing visual evidence of protein migration and transfer efficiency and are sometimes even used for positive control.

Effects of gel conditions
As with DNA electrophoresis, conditions such as buffers, charge/voltage, and concentration should be taken into account when selecting a protein marker.

RNA markers

Development
RNA ladders composed of RNA molecular-weight size markers were initially developed by using the synthetic circle method to produce different-sized markers. This technique was improved upon by inventor Eric T. Kool to use circular DNA vectors as a method for producing RNA molecular-weight size markers. As referred to as the rolling circle method, the improvements of this technique stems from its efficiency in synthesizing RNA oligonucleotides. From the circular DNA template, single-stranded RNA varying in length from 4-1500 bp can be produced without the need for primers and by recycling nucleotide triphosphate. DNA can also be synthesized from the circular template, adding to this technique's versatility. In comparison to runoff transcription, the synthetic circle method produces RNA oligonucleotides without the runoff. In comparison to PCR, the synthetic circle method produces RNA oligonucleotides without the need for polymerase nor a thermal cycler. This method is also cost-efficient in its ability to synthesize grand amounts of product at a lower error rate than machine synthesizers.

Design
The RNA markers consist of RNA transcripts of various incrementing lengths. For example, the Lonza 0.5-9 kbp marker has bands marking 0.5, 1, 1.5, 2, 2.5, 3, 4, 5, 6, and 9 kilobase pairs. Markers are dissolved in a storage buffer, such as EDTA, and can have a shelf life of up to 2 years when stored at -80 °C. To use the marker, such as for northern blot analysis, it is first thawed, and then stained so that it is detectable on a gel electrophoresis. One of the most common dyes used for markers is ethidium bromide.

The range of a particular marker refers to variety of bands it can map. A "high" range refers to relatively large fragments (measured in kb) while a "low" range refers to markers that distinguish between small fragments (measured in bp). Some markers can even be described as "ultra-low range", but even more precise is the microRNA marker. A microRNA marker can be used to measure RNA fragments within a dozen nucleotides, such as the 17-25 nt microRNA marker.

Use
At equivalent molecular weights, RNA will migrate faster than DNA. However, both RNA and DNA have a negative linear slope between their migration distance and logarithmic molecular weight. That is, samples of less weight are able to migrate a greater distance. This relationship is a consideration when choosing RNA or DNA markers as a standard.

When running RNA markers and RNA samples on a gel, it is important to prevent nuclease contamination, as RNA is very sensitive to ribonuclease (RNase) degradation through catalysis. Thus, all materials to be used in the procedure must be taken into consideration. Any glassware that is to come into contact with RNA should be pretreated with diethylpyrocarbonate (DEPC) and plastic materials should be disposable.

Molecular-weight size markers and SDS-PAGE

One of the most common uses for molecular-weight size markers is in gel electrophoresis. The purpose of gel electrophoresis is to separate proteins by physical or chemical properties, which include charge, molecular size, and pH.< When separating based on size, the ideal method is SDS-PAGE or polyacrylamide gel electrophoresis and molecular-weight size markers are the appropriate standards to use.

Gels can vary in size. The number of samples to be run will determine the appropriate gel size. All gels are divided into lanes that run parallel through the gel. Each lane will contain a specific sample. Typically, molecular-weight size standards are placed in an outer lane. If a gel has a particularly high number of lanes, then multiple ladders may be placed across the gel for higher clarity.
 
Proteins and standards are pipetted on the gel in appropriate lanes. Sodium dodecyl sulfate (SDS) interacts with proteins, denaturing them, and giving them a negative charge. Since all proteins have the same charge-to-mass ratio, protein mobility through the gel will solely be based on molecular weight.  Once the electric field is turned on, protein migration will initiate. Upon completion, a detection mechanism such as western blotting can be used, which will reveal the presence of bands.  Each band represents a specific protein. The distance of travel is solely based on molecular weight; therefore, the molecular weight of each protein can be determined by comparing the distance of an unknown protein to the standard of known molecular weight.

Different uses of molecular-weight size markers
Many kinds of molecular-weight size markers exist, and each possess unique characteristics, lending to their involvement in a number of biological techniques. Selection of a molecular-weight size marker depends upon the marker type (DNA, RNA, or protein) and the length range it offers (e.g. 1kb). Before selecting a molecular-weight size marker, it is important to become familiar with these characteristics and properties. In a particular instance one type may be more appropriate than another. Although specific markers can vary between protocols for a given technique, this section will outline general markers and their roles.

Allozymes
The first type of molecular marker developed and run on gel electrophoresis were allozymes. These markers are used for the detection of protein variation. The word "allozyme" (also known as "alloenzyme") comes from "allelic variants of enzymes." When run on a gel, proteins are separated by size and charge. Although allozymes may seem dated when compared to the other markers available, they are still used today, mainly due to their low cost. One major downside is that since there is only a limited amount available, specificity an issue.

DNA-based markers (1960s)
Although allozymes can detect variations in DNA, it is by an indirect method and not very accurate. DNA-based markers were developed in the 1960s. These markers are much more effective at distinguishing between DNA variants. Today these are the most commonly used markers. DNA-based markers work by surveying nucleotides, which can serve a variety of functions, such as detecting differences in nucleotides or even quantifying the number of mutations.

PCR-based markers (1980s)
The success of DNA based markers lead to the development of PCR. PCR (polymerase chain reaction) is a DNA amplification technique that can be applied to various types of fragments. Prior to this development, to amplify DNA, it had to be cloned or isolated. Shortly after the discovery of PCR came the idea of using PCR-based markers for gel electrophoresis. These type of markers are based on PCR primers and are categorized as DNA sequence polymorphism.

DNA sequence polymorphism
Although technically speaking, DNA sequence polymorphism has been going on since the use of RFLP in the 1960s, the analysis has changed significantly over the years. DNA sequence polymorphism uses older techniques like RFLP, but on a larger scale. Sequencing is much faster and more efficient. The analysis is automated, as it uses a technique known as shotgun sequencing. This high-throughput method is commonly used in population genetics.

Polysaccharide analysis by carbohydrate gel electrophoresis
Carbohydrate markers are employed in a technique known as polysaccharide analysis by carbohydrate gel electrophoresis (PACE), which is a measurable separation technique.
It allows for the analysis of enzyme hydrolysis products. It has been used in applications such as characterizing enzymes involved in hemicellulose degradation, determining the structure of hemicellulose polysaccharides, and analysis of enzymatic cleavage of cellulose products.

PACE depends on derivitization, which is the conversion of a chemical compound into a derivative. Here monosaccharides, oligosaccharides, and polysaccharides are the compounds of interest. They are labeled at their reducing ends with a fluorescent label (i.e. a fluorophore). This derivitization with a fluorophore permits both separation on a gel under the desired circumstances and fluorescence imaging of the gel. In this case, a polyacrylamide gel is used.

As with DNA, RNA, and protein electrophoresis, markers are run alongside the samples of interest in carbohydrate gel electrophoresis. The markers consist of oligosaccharides of known molecular weight. Like the samples of interest, the marker is also derivitized with a fluorophore (usually with 8-aminonaphthalene-1,3,6-trisulfonic acid (ANTS) or 2-aminoacridone).

References

Biochemistry methods
Biological techniques and tools
Biotechnology
Genetics techniques